Leatherside chub is a common name for several fishes and may refer to:

Northern leatherside chub, Lepidomeda copei, endemic to Idaho, Wyoming and Utah
Southern leatherside chub, Lepidomeda aliciae, endemic to Utah